John Robert Schreiber (born March 5, 1994) is an American professional baseball pitcher for the Boston Red Sox of Major League Baseball (MLB). He has previously played in MLB for the Detroit Tigers.

Career
Schreiber was born in Wyandotte, Michigan, raised in nearby Rockwood, and attended Carlson High School in Gibraltar. He played college baseball at  Henry Ford Community College in Dearborn for two seasons, and then transferred to the University of Northwestern Ohio for two seasons.

Detroit Tigers
The Detroit Tigers selected Schreiber in the 16th round of the 2016 MLB draft, where he signed for a $6,000 bonus. After signing with Detroit, he was assigned to the Connecticut Tigers, where he went 2–3 in 18 games with a 2.76 ERA and 1.09 WHIP. In 2017, he played for the West Michigan Whitecaps where he improved to a 5–1 record and 0.54 ERA in 27 relief appearances. Opponents only batted .147 off Schreiber and he held opposing batters to a 0.66 WHIP. Schreiber then advanced to the Double-A Erie SeaWolves in 2018, where he finished with a 2.48 ERA and 18 saves in 23 opportunities, while pitching in 49 games total over the course of the year. He began 2019 in Erie, but after allowing just two runs in seven innings, and with opponents hitting .154 off him, he was called up to the Triple-A Toledo Mud Hens.

On August 8, 2019, the Tigers selected Schreiber's contract and promoted him to the major leagues. Schreiber earned his first major league win on September 7, pitching the final  of an inning in the Tigers' 5–4 extra innings victory over the Oakland Athletics. He pitched 13 innings for the 2019 Tigers, compiling a 6.23 ERA with 19 strikeouts.

With the 2020 Tigers, Schreiber appeared in 15 games, compiling a 0–1 record with 6.32 ERA and 14 strikeouts in  innings pitched. On February 12, 2021, Schreiber was designated for assignment following the signing of Nomar Mazara.

Boston Red Sox
On February 18, 2021, Schreiber was claimed off waivers by the Boston Red Sox. On March 30, the Red Sox designated Schreiber for assignment. On April 2, he was sent outright to the team's alternate training site. After pitching in Triple-A with the Worcester Red Sox, Schreiber was added to Boston's active roster on September 1, then appeared in a single game, allowing one run in three innings. He was returned to Worcester on September 6 and removed from the 40-man roster. In 33 appearances (eight starts) with Worcester, Schreiber compiled a 2.71 ERA and 3–3 record while striking out 65 batters in  innings.

Schreiber began the 2022 season with Worcester, and was added to Boston's active roster on April 25. He was returned to Worcester on April 29 and removed from the team's 40-man roster. Schreiber was recalled to Boston on May 6 when Rich Hill was placed on the COVID-related injured list. On May 10, Schreiber earned his first major-league save, throwing two shutout innings against the Atlanta Braves. In 64 relief appearances with Boston during 2022, Schreiber posted a 4–4 record with eight saves and 2.22 ERA while striking out 74 batters in 65 innings.

References

External links

1994 births
Living people
People from Wyandotte, Michigan
Baseball players from Michigan
Major League Baseball pitchers
Detroit Tigers players
Boston Red Sox players
Henry Ford Hawks baseball players
University of Northwestern Ohio alumni
Connecticut Tigers players
West Michigan Whitecaps players
Erie SeaWolves players
Toledo Mud Hens players
Mesa Solar Sox players
Worcester Red Sox players
Alaska Goldpanners of Fairbanks players